Repton is a video game originally developed by 16-year-old Briton Tim Tyler for the BBC Micro and Acorn Electron and released by Superior Software in 1985. The game spawned a series of follow up games which were released throughout the 1980s. The series sold around 125,000 copies between 1985 and 1990 with Repton 2 selling 35,000 itself. The games have since been remade for several modern systems, including iRepton for the iPhone / iPod Touch in 2010, and  Android Repton 1, Android Repton 2 and Android Repton 3 from 2016 to 2018.

The author was inspired by a review of the recently released Boulder Dash, but had never played the game. Compared with Boulder Dash, Repton is a much more calm and organized playing experience with the emphasis on puzzle-solving as opposed to arcade-style improvisation. This remained true as more types of object were added in the sequels.

Series overview

Repton

Repton, the titular protagonist, is moved around an underground maze in a quest to find all the diamonds (some are held in safes, their release being triggered by finding and collecting a key) within a time limit for each of several levels, while avoiding being trapped or killed by falling rocks and monsters hatched from eggs. The original Repton game was released in the summer of 1985 and has 12 levels, with passwords making it possible to jump directly to later levels. If passwords are employed, on completion of the final level the displayed message challenges the player to complete the game without using them. The new versions of Repton for the PC, iOS and Android introduce additional levels; and new Repton levels are also featured in Repton Spectacular, Repton's Mystic Challenge (for Repton 1) and Repton's Journeys (for Repton 2).

Repton 2
The sequel to the game, Repton 2, released for Christmas 1985 (release date 14 November 1985 ) is much bigger. It introduces several new features: spirits (that follow walls and objects to their left and must be guided into cages, turning them into diamonds) and skulls, both of which are fatal to Repton on collision. There are also jigsaw puzzle pieces to collect, which eventually spell out the message "Repton 2 is ended".  There are no levels as such in Repton 2: instead transporters move Repton between different screens which, subject to some restrictions, can be completed in any order desired.  The entire game is in effect one very large level without passwords, meaning that it must be completed in one attempt.  Finally, some screens also contain an exposed 'roof', where meteors (predictably fatal to Repton) fall from the sky.

Repton's requirements in Repton 2 are challenging: Repton must not only collect all diamonds (including those held in safes and behind cages), but also collect all earth, kill all the monsters, collect all puzzle pieces and use all transporters.  Once these substantial tasks have been accomplished, Repton must then negotiate the 'roof' of the entire width of the final screen, avoiding meteors falling from the sky in order to reach the starport and thus complete the game.  This part is particularly tricky, since the meteors fall in a random fashion, making it difficult for the gamer to guide Repton to safety.  This long list of requirements, coupled with the fact that the game must be completed in one attempt, is unique among the Repton series and makes Repton 2 by far the hardest Repton game to successfully complete.  Unfortunately a bug in the original version of Repton 2 meant that the game contained one diamond fewer than the stipulated number needed to finish the game, so completion of this first version is impossible. When Repton 2 was re-written for the PC, it introduced a 'save game' feature making it considerably easier to complete. In addition, brand new scenarios were included, effectively new games.

Repton 3
Repton 3, released 5 November 1986,  was developed by Matthew Atkinson at Superior's invitation since Tim Tyler was not interested in programming it—although he did design some of the levels for the new game. While the first two games had only taken a month each to program, Repton 3 took eight months. It reverts to the form of a series of time-limited, password-protected levels. A few new features were introduced: fungus (a substance that gradually spreads wherever it finds space and kills Repton on contact), time capsules (resetting the current level's time limit each time one is collected), crowns and a timebomb which must be defused to complete each level. The inclusion of the timebomb means that, as well as collecting all of the diamonds and crowns, the user has to plan their route so as to finish up at the timebomb at the end of the level.

Repton 3 includes a map editor along with the game, so that data files can be created with new maps and graphics for the levels. Three themed sets of such files were released as continuations of Repton 3, with the titles Around the World in 40 Screens (1987), The Life of Repton (1987) and Repton Thru Time (1988). These three titles use a slightly modified game engine, in which the algorithm for deciding on the direction spirits first move at the start of a level is improved. They all come with the same game editor as Repton 3.

Repton Infinity
Repton Infinity was released in 1988, by which time the BBC Micro's popularity as a games platform was beginning to wane. It was developed by Dave Acton and Dave Lawrence (who wrote the user-submitted program section *INFO in Acorn User magazine). It supplements the map editor and graphics editor with a powerful game logic editor which made it possible to alter the way all game objects behaved using a purpose-designed language called Reptol. Four different example games are included to demonstrate its flexibility:
 Repton 3 - Take 2, with a couple of small technical differences in gameplay from Repton 3;
 Repton 4, with imaginative new objects including photocopiers and moving jewels;
 Robbo, “a crazy robot in a strange topsy-turvy world”, according to the game inlay; and
 Trakker, a chaotic game in which a bulldozer-driving protagonist must destroy various monsters by pushing fruit at them, and all scores are multiples of 17.

There was a long-running problem, infamous amongst owners of the B+, the updated BBC B with 64k,  when the newly released Repton Infinity ran on the original BBC B but refused to load on the updated B+. A string of unsuccessful replacements were issued before one that was compatible with both was eventually released.

EGO: Repton 4

A game marketed as EGO: Repton 4, was released for the Acorn Archimedes in 1992. It was designed by Richard Hanson and programmed by Gary Partis. This was actually an Archimedes conversion of an earlier Amiga/Atari ST game called Personality Crisis with the character of Repton added in. The game bears little relation to the rest of the Repton series, particularly in that contrary to the spirit of the original it relies on "secret" traps and passages which can only be discovered by walking onto them.  (The objects and objectives in all the previous Repton games are visible and there are no hidden secrets to be discovered, although in some advanced episodes - notably "OAP" in Life of Repton, "Oceans" in Around the World and "Future" in Repton Thru Time - some objects and enemies are invisible or appear very similar to desirable or innocuous objects.)

Repton: The Lost Realms
In 1988, teenage programmer Paras Sidapara submitted a game he called Repton 4 to Superior Software. As Superior were already working on Repton Infinity, it was not published, and was forgotten until 2008, when a copy was rediscovered. The game was re-programmed by Sarah Walker and rechristened The Lost Realms, to avoid confusion with the Repton 4 game included in Repton Infinity. It was launched in November 2010 by Retro Software, with Superior's permission. The game is similar in style to Repton 3, retaining the structure of separate, password-protected levels and the map and graphics editors. New features include balloons, "absorbency" doors (which can be opened when an "absorbalene" pill is collected, but each pill only allows a certain number of doors to be opened) and ice crystals (which, when collected, freeze any monsters on the level).

Music
The music for Repton is Black and White Rag, by George Botsford, which has been well known in Britain at least since its 1969 popularization as the theme tune to the long-running TV snooker programme Pot Black. The Scott Joplin intermezzo The Chrysanthemum is the music for Repton 2. The music for Repton 3 was composed specifically for the game by Paul Hughes and Peter Clarke. Repton Infinity features in-game music, on pressing the 'T' key, although it does not play at the same time as the sound effects during the game, and is turned off by default. It was composed especially for the game by David Acton.

Repton ports, clones and derivatives

Ports
The Repton games were closely associated with the BBC Micro and Acorn Electron but versions were released for other 8-bit computers. Superior Software had planned to launch Repton 3 with ports for the Commodore 64 and Amstrad CPC (as shown in pre-release press advertisements). The Amstrad version was never released but the C64 port did arrive in 1987. Ports of the first 3 Repton games were later developed for the ZX Spectrum and Repton and Repton 2 were released together as Repton Mania in 1989 (published using the joint Superior/Alligata name). This was not a success and the Spectrum Repton 3 was not released. In 1989 a version of Repton 3 featuring all expansion packs was also released for the BBC Micro's replacement, the 32-bit Acorn Archimedes. Its programmer, John Wallace, also produced a slightly expanded version of Repton 2 for the Acorn Archimedes which was released on the 1993 Play It Again Sam 2 compilation (which also included Zarch, Master Break and Arcpinball). None of these ports achieved the sales of the BBC originals.

In the late 1990s, Superior sub-licensed the games to ProAction who released a number of RISC OS ports for the Acorn Archimedes and RiscPC. John Wallace created new ports of Repton, Repton 2 and Repton 3. ProAction also released Desktop Repton which includes the 3 games (including the expansion games for Repton 3). These games were built from scratch by Darren Salt, and developed to run in a multi tasking window on the desktop. There was also Desktop Repton Plus, with new PC graphics and extra levels included for Repton 1.

There have been numerous ports of Repton 3, including a free version for Linux.

Under the name Superior Interactive, the original publishers re-released versions of Repton 1 (2003), Repton 2 (2004) and Repton 3, including all of the expansion games (2005), for Microsoft Windows. They also released a large pack of new levels for all three modern Repton ports named Repton Spectacular in 2010. Also in 2010, iRepton was released for the Apple iPhone / iPod Touch (ESZ Consulting / Superior Interactive). This has retro and enhanced graphics and sounds and new screens. On 7 October 2014 iRepton 3 was released for the iPad and iPhone, featuring the same level of graphic enhancements as iRepton 1, which also had an overhaul at the same time.

Clones

A deliberate clone called Ripton, extremely faithful apart from different level design and several humorous digs at the original game, was written by Kenton Price and submitted to A&B Computing but the magazine never dared to publish it. It is, however, now available at BBC software Internet sites.

There was also a PD clone for the ZX Spectrum called Riptoff, which included a level editor. It was developed by Rick O'Neill and Craig Hunter, and was released exclusively on a 1991 Your Sinclair covertape.

Derivatives
Because of Repton'''s ubiquity on the platform it became impossible not to compare to it any later commercial scrolling-map game for the BBC/Electron.  Later puzzle-based games such as Bonecruncher and Clogger might justifiably be said to be derivative of Repton, but this perception also encompassed arcade adventure/role-playing games presented in the four-way-scrolling format (the notable ones being Ravenskull and Pipeline) despite their different style involving unique objects and encounters and unexpected traps.

A non-scrolling 5-level type-in called Pitfall Pete written by Jonathan Temple was also described as "'Repton' style" when it was published by BEEBUG in 1986 and expanded to 15 levels in 1991.Repton's original author has written a public domain Java rocks-and-diamonds game, Rockz, which features elements in the vein of both Repton 2 and Boulder Dash.

A game called Mole Miner was released for Android devices in 2009 by Little Fluffy Toys Ltd. The game was designed by Kenton Price, who also wrote Ripton (see above). It builds on the rocks-and-diamonds genre typified by Repton, extending it with features such as explosives, sliding ice and wraparound, and includes a community level designer. Mole Miner contains 60 levels created by Michael S. Repton, the author of many levels in later Repton'' series games.

References

External links
 Superior Interactive
 Repton author's personal website
 Repton Resource Page

1985 video games
Rocks-and-diamonds games
Superior Software games
Acorn Archimedes games
BBC Micro and Acorn Electron games
Commodore 64 games
IOS games
Video games about reptiles
Video games developed in the United Kingdom
Windows games
ZX Spectrum games
Linux games